Rockville is an unincorporated community in Putnam County, in the U.S. state of Georgia. It lies about 12 miles east of Eatonton.

History
A post office called Rockville was established in 1826, and remained in operation until 1907.

References

Unincorporated communities in Putnam County, Georgia